Sanlakas is a party-list organization in the Philippines. It is a progressive coalition of different marginalized sectors in the Philippines founded on October 29, 1993.

After topping the party-list tally in the National Capital Region, Sanlakas won a seat in the House of Representatives in 1998, the first party-list elections in the Philippines. Sanlakas won a seat in the lower house for the second time in 2001.

Some of the notable affiliates of Sanlakas are Bukluran ng Manggagawang Pilipino, Kongreso ng Pagkakaisa ng Maralita ng Lungsod (KPML), Aniban ng Manggagawa sa Agrikultura (AMA), Zone One Tondo Organization (ZOTO), Metro Manila Vendors' Alliance (MMVA), Alliance of Transport Operators Member Intra-Cebu (ATOMIC), Teachers' Dignity Coalition (TDC), Pagkakaisa ng mga Manggagawa sa Transportasyon (PMT), and Piglas-Kabataan.

Track record

Known as an activist political party, Sanlakas constantly figures in protest actions against certain policies of the government like the Electric Power Industry Reform Act, the Cybercrime Prevention Act, the Mining Act of 1995, among others.

Sanlakas was also a petitioner in several cases in the Supreme Court of the Philippines against Philippine laws and policies they deem detrimental to the welfare of the Filipino people like the Oil Deregulation Law, and the declaration of a State of Rebellion during the time of President Gloria Macapagal Arroyo.

Among the victims of the serial killings of political activists in the Philippines, during the Arroyo administration, are Sanlakas members like trade unionist Andrew Inoza, peasant leader
Frank Labial, and revolutionary socialist Filemon Lagman. Lagman, one of the founders of Sanlakas, is considered as the first prominent victim of political assassination under the presidency of Gloria Arroyo.

Representatives to Congress
11th Congress (1998–2001) - Rene Magtubo, Mario Cruz
12th Congress (2001–2004) - Jose Virgilio Bautista

2013 elections

The Philippine Commission on Elections (COMELEC) accredited Sanlakas for the 2013 party-list elections after being delisted earlier due to their failure to participate in the 2010 elections.

Congressional nominees
Manjette Lopez - Sanlakas National President and Freedom from Debt Coalition Vice President
Tita Flor Santos - Sanlakas National Treasurer, a veteran urban poor organizer and adviser to the MMVA
Aaron Pedrosa - Sanlakas Secretary-General and a former student leader
Rasti Delizo - Sanlakas Auditor and an expert on foreign policy and geo-politics
Erwin Puhawan - Migrant workers advocate and labor leader

Electoral performance
*Veterans Federation Party vs. COMELEC

References

See also
Partido Lakas ng Masa

Party-lists represented in the House of Representatives of the Philippines
Political parties established in 1993
Socialist parties in the Philippines
1993 establishments in the Philippines